A. R. Rahman is an Indian composer, singer and songwriter. Described by Time as one of the most popular composers, he has provided musical scores predominantly for Tamil and Hindi films apart from a few films in other regional film industries of India and international productions. Rahman started his career by composing musical scores for documentaries, advertisements and Television channels. He made his debut as a film composer through Roja after being approached by its director Mani Ratnam. The soundtrack became popular upon release, which led to him winning the National Film Award for Best Music Direction at the 40th National Film Awards, the first time for a debutant. As of 2018, Rahman has garnered 6 National Film Awards, 15 Filmfare Awards and 17 Filmfare Awards South, a record for an Indian composer.

Honorary

Government

Honorary Doctorate

Other Honorary Awards 

 1994 – Sanskriti Award
 Contributions to music awarded by the Sanskriti Foundation
 1995 – Bommai Nagi Reddy Award
 1995 – Mauritius National Award
Contributions to music awarded by Mauritius
 1995 – Malaysian Award
 Contributions to music awarded by Malaysia
 1995 – Rajiv Gandhi Award
 1996 – 'Gana Kaladhar'
 2001 – Al-Ameen Education Society Community Award
 2002 – Amir Khusro Sangeet Nawaz Award
2005 – Mahavir-Mahatma Award
2006 – Honorary Award from Stanford University
 2006 – Sanatan Sangeet Puraskar
Contributions to music awarded by the Sanatan Sangeet Sanskriti
 2006 – Swaralaya Yesudas Award
 Swaralaya-Kairali-Yesudas Award for outstanding performance in the music field
 2007 – Limca Book of Records Indian of the Year for Contribution to Popular Music
 2008 – CNN-IBN Global Indian of the Year
 2008 – NDTV Indian of the Year
 2008 – Rotary Club of Madras
 Lifetime Achievement Award
 2009 – CNN-IBN Entertainer of the Year
 2009 – CNN-IBN Indian of the Year
 2009 – NDTV Global Indian Entertainer Award
 2009 – UK Asian Music Award for Outstanding Achievement
 2009 – Placed by Time magazine in List of World's Most Influential People.
 2010 – 10th Annual Mahindra Indo-American Arts Council Film Festival
Special Achievement Award for Significant Contribution to the Globalization of Indian Music
 2010 – British Asian Awards for Outstanding Achievement in Music
2010 – Indira Gandhi Award for National Integration
 2010 – FICCI Global Icon
2010 – "Crystal Award"
Lifetime Achievement Award instituted by World Economic Forum
2010 – Outstanding Achievement in Music at The Asian Awards
2011 – GQ Legend of the Year Award
2011 – Lifetime Achievement Award at the 8th Dubai International Film Festival
2012 – Vuclip Icons of the Year 2012 – Most Admired Bollywood Music Composer
2016 – Fukuoka Prize (Japan)
2018 – Lifetime Achievement Award From KISS Foundation
2019 – "Global Icon Of Inspiration" (Behindwoods Gold Mic Music Awards)

Film awards and nominations

★ Academy Awards

★ BAFTA Awards

★ Golden Globe Awards

★ Grammy Awards

★ World Soundtrack Awards

★ Satellite Awards

★ Critics' Choice Movie Awards

★ Asian Film Awards

★ National Film Awards

★ Tamil Nadu State Film Awards

★ Filmfare Awards

Soundtrack

Background Score

Special Awards

★ Filmfare Awards South

Tamil

Telugu

★ IIFA Awards

Soundtrack

Background Score

Special Awards

★ Other Awards 

BIG Star Entertainment Awards
2011 – BIG Star Most Entertaining Song – "Saadda Haq" (Rockstar)
Bollywood Music Awards
2000 – Best Music Direction – Taal
2000 – Song of the Year – "Taal Se Taal Mila" (Taal)
2002 – Best Music Director – Lagaan
2003 – Best Music Director – Saathiya
Cinema Express Awards
1993 – Best Music Director (Tamil) – Roja
1994 – Best Music Director (Tamil) – Gentleman
1995 – Best Music Director (Tamil) – Kadhalan
1997 – Best Music Director (Tamil) – Kadhal Desam
1999 – Best Music Director (Tamil) – Jeans
2013 – Best Music Director (Tamil) – Maryan

 Global Film & Music Festival Award
 2023 – Best Music Composer for Feature Film in Foreign Language – Iravin Nizhal

 Global Indian Film Awards (GIFA)
 2007 – Best Music Director – Rang De Basanti
 2007 – Best Background Music – Rang De Basanti

IIFA Utsavam
2017 – Best Music Director (Tamil) – Achcham Yenbadhu Madamaiyada
CineGoers' Award
1993 – Best Music Director (Tamil) – Roja
1994 – Best Music Director (Tamil) – Gentleman
1995 – Best Music Director (Tamil) – Kadhalan
1996 – Best Music Director (Tamil) – Bombay
Film Fans' Awards
1993 – Best Music Director (Tamil) – Roja
1994 – Best Music Director (Tamil) – Gentleman
1995 – Best Music Director (Tamil) – Kadhalan
1996 – Best Music Director (Tamil) – Bombay
Kalasaagar Awards
1993 – Best Music Director (Tamil) – Roja
1994 – Best Music Director (Tamil) – Gentleman
1995 – Best Music Director (Tamil) – Kadhalan
1996 – Best Music Director (Tamil) – Bombay
Sangeet Awards
2004 – Best Music Direction (Critics Award) – Yuva
2004 – Best Music Arrangement (Critics Award) – "Yeh Rishta" – Meenaxi: A Tale of Three Cities
2005 – Best Music Direction (Critics Award) – Swades
Screen Videocon Awards / Star Screen Awards
1998 – Best Non-Film Album – Vande Mataram (Non-Film category)
2000 – Best Music Director – Taal
2007 – Best Background Music – Rang De Basanti
2008 – Best Music Director – Guru
2008 – Best Background Music – Guru
2009 – Best Music Director – Jaane Tu...Ya Jaane Na
2009 – Best Background Music – Jodhaa Akbar
2010 – Best Music Director – Delhi-6
2012 – Best Music Directoe – Rockstar
Screen-Videocon Awards South
1997 – Best Music Director (Tamil) – Kadhal Desam
1998 – Best Music Director (Tamil) – Minsara Kanavu
South Indian International Movie Awards (SIIMA)
2017 – Best Music Director (Tamil) – Achcham Yenbadhu Madamaiyada
Zee Cine Awards
 2000 – Best Music Director – Taal
 2002 – Best Music Director – Lagaan
 2003 – Best Music Director – Saathiya
 2007 – Best Music Director – Rang De Basanti
 2008 – Best Music Director – Guru
 2008 – Best Background Music – Guru
 2012 – Best Music Director – Rockstar
Vijay Awards
 2007 – Best Music Director – Sivaji
 2008 – Chevalier Sivaji Ganesan Award for Excellence in Indian Cinema
 2010 – Best Music Director – Vinnaithaandi Varuvaayaa
 2013 – Best Music Director – Kadal
 2017 – Best Music Director – Kaatru Veliyidai
Vikatan Awards
 2011 – Best Music Director – Vinnaithaandi Varuvaayaa
2016 – Best Music Director – O Kadhal Kanmani
2017 – Best Music Director – Mersal and Kaatru Veliyidai
V. Shantaram Award
2001 – Best Music Director – Taal
2007 – Best Music Director – Guru
2008 – Best Music Director – Jodhaa Akbar
CineMAA Awards
 2011 – Best Music Director – Ye Maaya Chesave
CNN-IBN Song of the Year Award
 2006 – "Roobaroo" (Rang De Basanti)
 2007 – "Tere Bina" (Guru)
 2008 – "Kabhi Kabhi Aditi" (Jaane Tu Ya Jaane Na)
Mirchi Music Awards
 2008 (Tata Indicom Mirchi Music Awards)
 Album of the Year – Jaane Tu Ya Jaane Na
 Music Director of the Year – A. R. Rahman for Jaane Tu Ya Jaane Na
 Tata Indicom Mirchi Listeners Choice Album of the Year – Jaane Tu Ya Jaane Na
 Tata Indicom Mirchi Listeners Choice Song of the Year – "Kabhi Kabhi Aditi" (Jaane Tu Ya Jaane Na)
 Technical Award For Film Background Score – Jodhaa Akbar
 2009
 Music Director of the Year – A. R. Rahman for Delhi-6
 Album of the Year – Delhi-6
 Best Song Arranger and Programmer – "Masakali" (Delhi-6)
 Song of the Year – "Masakali" (Delhi-6)
 2010
 Best Programmer & Arranger of the Year – "Ranjha Ranjha" (Raavan) – Nominated
 Best Background Score of the Year – Raavan – Nominated
 2011
 Album of The Year – Rockstar
 Listeners' Choice Album of the Year – Rockstar
 Listeners' Choice Song of the Year – "Naadan Parindey" (Rockstar)
 Music Composer of The Year – "Naadan Parindey" (Rockstar)
 Music Composer of The Year – "Sadda Haq" (Rockstar) – Nominated
 Song of The Year – "Naadan Parindey" (Rockstar) – Nominated
 Song of The Year – "Sadda Haq" (Rockstar) – Nominated
 2012
 Background Score of the Year – Jab Tak Hai Jaan – Nominated
 2014
 Best Background Score – Highway – Nominated
Planet-Bollywood People's Choice Awards
2006: People's Choice Best Music Award – Rang De Basanti
2006: People's Choice Best Background Music Award – Rang De Basanti
SuMu Music Awards
1993: R. D. Burman Award for Best New Composer
Sunfeast Tamil Music Awards
 2008: Best Music Composer of the Year – Sivaji: The Boss

Black Reel Awards
2008 – Best Original Soundtrack – Slumdog Millionaire
BMI London Awards
2010 – Best Score – Couples Retreat
Denver Film Critics Society Awards
2010 – Best Song – "If I Rise" – 127 Hours
Los Angeles Film Critics Association Awards (United States)
2008 – Best Music Score – Slumdog Millionaire
New York Film Critics Online Awards (United States)
2008 – NYFCO Award for Best Score – Slumdog Millionaire
Phoenix Film Critics Society Awards
2008 – Best Original Score – Slumdog Millionaire
San Diego Film Critics Society Awards (United States)
2008 – Best Score – Slumdog Millionaire

 Jaipur International Film Festival Award
 2023 – Best Music – Iravin Nizhal

 Just Plain Folks Music Awards
 2009 – Just Plain Folks Music Award For Best Music Album – Varalaru
MTV Awards
MTV Video Music Awards
1999 – International Viewer's Choice Awards (MTV India) – "Dil Se Re" – Dil Se..
MTV Asia Awards
2003 – MTV Asia Award for Favorite Artist India
MTV Immies
2003 – Best Music Composer (Film Category) – "Saathiya" – Saathiya
UK Asian Music Awards (United Kingdom)
2009 – Outstanding Achievement by an Asian in Music Field

Zee Cine Awards Tamil
Zee Cine Award Tamil for Pride of Indian Cinema (2020)

Nominations

National 
BIG Star Entertainment Awards
2011 – BIG Star Most Entertaining Music – Rockstar
International Indian Film Academy Awards
2001 – Best Music Direction – Fiza
2009 – Best Music Direction – Ghajini
Filmfare Awards
2005 – Best Music Direction – Swades
2008 – Best Male Playback Singer – "Tere Bina" from Guru
2009 – Best Music Direction – Ghajini
2009 – Best Music Direction – Jodhaa Akbar
2011 – Best Background Score – Raavan
2014 – Best Music Direction – Raanjhanaa
2014 – Best Background Score – Raanjhanaa
2015 – Best Background Score – Highway
2016 – Best Music Direction – Tamasha
Filmfare Awards South
2004 – Best Music Director (Tamil) – Boys
2008 – Best Music Director (Tamil) – Azhagiya Tamil Magan
2009 – Best Music Director (Tamil) – Sakkarakatti
2011 – Best Music Director (Tamil) – Enthiran
2014 – Best Music Director (Tamil) – Maryan
2015 – Best Music Director (Tamil) – Kaaviya Thalaivan
2016 – Best Music Director (Tamil) – O Kadhal Kanmani
2017 – Best Music Director (Tamil) – 24
2017 – Best Music Director (Telugu) – Sahasam Swasaga Sagipo
South Indian International Movie Awards
2013 – Best Music Director (Kannada) – Godfather
2018 – Best Male Playback Singer – "Neethanae"
2018 – Best Music Director (Tamil) – Kaatru Veliyidai
2019 – Best Music Director (Tamil) – Chekka Chivantha Vaanam
2019 – Best Male Playback Singer – "Mazha Kuruvi"
Screen Weekly Awards
2002 – Best Music Director – Lagaan
2002 – Best Background Score – Lagaan
CineMAA Awards
2004 – Best Music Director – Nee Manasu Naaku Telusu
Zee Cine Awards
2005 – Best Music Director – Swades
2005 – Best Background Score – Meenaxi: A Tale of Three Cities
2011 – Best Background Score – Raavan

International 
Academy Awards (United States)
2009 – Best Original Song – "Jai Ho" – Slumdog Millionaire (with Gulzar)
2009 – Best Original Score – Slumdog Millionaire
2010 – Best Original Score – 127 Hours  (Nominated)
2010 – Best Original Song – "If I Rise" – 127 Hours (with Dido and Rollo Armstrong) (Nominated)
Asian Film Awards (Hong Kong International Film Festival)
2009 – Best Composer – Jodhaa Akbar
2019 – Best Original Music – Sanju
British Academy Film Awards (BAFTA) (United Kingdom)
2010 – Best Original Music – 127 Hours
Broadcast Film Critics Association Awards
2008 – Critics' Choice Award for Best Song – "Jai Ho" – Slumdog Millionaire
Dora Mavor Moore Awards (Canada)
 2006 – General Theatre Division – Outstanding Musical Direction – The Lord of the Rings (along with Värttinä)
Chicago Film Critics Association Awards
2008 – Best Original Score – Slumdog Millionaire
Golden Globe Awards
2010 – Best Original Score – 127 Hours
Houston Film Critics Society Awards
2008 – Best Original Score – Slumdog Millionaire
2008 – Best Original Song – "Jai Ho" (performed by Sukhwinder Singh, written by A. R. Rahman and Gulzar)
2010 – Best Original Score – 127 Hours
2010 – Best Original Song – "If I Rise" (performed by Dido and A. R. Rahman, written by A. R. Rahman and Rollo)
Laurence Olivier Awards (United Kingdom)
 2003 – Best New Musical – Bombay Dreams
MTV Awards
MTV India
2006 – MTV Youth Icon of the Year
MTV Movie Awards
2009 – Best Song From a Movie – "Jai Ho" – Slumdog Millionaire
Satellite Awards (United States)
2008 – Satellite Award for Best Original Song – "Jai Ho" – Slumdog Millionaire
2010 – Satellite Award for Best Original Score – 127 Hours
2010 – Satellite Award for Best Original Song – "If I Rise" – 127 Hours
WAFCA Awards
2010 – Best Score – 127 Hours
World Soundtrack Awards
2009 – Best Original Score of the Year – Slumdog Millionaire
2009 – Best Original Song Written Directly for a Film – "Jai Ho" – Slumdog Millionaire with M.I.A.
2011 – Best Original Song Written Directly for a Film – "If I Rise" – 127 Hours

Longlisted 
This section refers to awards where Rahman has been considered for a nomination but has not been nominated.

Academy Awards
2007 – Best Original Song – "Lukka Chuppi" – Rang De Basanti
2007 – Best Original Song – "Khalbali" – Rang De Basanti
2007 – Best Original Song – "Aayo Re Sakhi" – Water
2010 – Best Original Song – "Nana" – Couples Retreat
2015 – Best Original Song – “Million Dollar Dream” – Million Dollar Arm
2015 – Best Original Song – “Spreading The Word/Makhna” – Million Dollar Arm
2015 – Best Original Song – “We Could Be Kings” – Million Dollar Arm
2015 – Best Original Song – “Afreen” – The Hundred-Foot Journey
2015 – Best Original Score – Kochadaiiyaan 
2015 – Best Original Score – The Hundred-Foot Journey
2015 – Best Original Score – Million Dollar Arm
2016 – Best Original Song – “Ginga” – Pelé: Birth of a Legend

Top lists 
Rahman's songs and soundtracks have been included in the following top lists:

2003 – In a BBC World Service, "Chaiyya Chaiyya" from Dil Se.. was voted 9th in "The World's Top Ten" songs of all time.
2005 – Rahman's debut soundtrack for Roja was listed in TIME's "10 Best Soundtracks" of all time by film critic Richard Corliss.
2007 – Rahman's soundtrack for Bombay was included in The Guardian'''s "1000 Albums to Hear Before You Die" list.
2009 – The song "Kehna Hi Kya" from Rahman's soundtrack for Bombay was included in The Guardian's "1000 Songs Everyone Must Hear" list.
2009 – Rahman's soundtrack for Lagaan was ranked at No. 45 on Amazon.com's "The 100 Greatest World Music Albums of All Time" list.

 Other achievements 
Rahman has sold more than 100 million records of his film scores and soundtracks worldwide, making him one of the top-selling recording artists.
Rahman is consistently ranked among the highest-paid celebrities in India; he has been included in the Forbes India Celebrity 100 list eight consecutive times since 2012.
In 2009, Time magazine placed him in its list of World's Most Influential People.
His name has also been included in the list of the 500 Most Influential Muslims in the World, issued by the Royal Islamic Strategic Studies Center in Amman, Jordan.
 The album rights for Tamil film Kandukondain Kandukondain were bought by Sa Re Ga Ma for a then record sum of 22 million. The record was reset by Sivaji: The Boss in 2007, and later by Enthiran in 2010.
 Enthiran'' reached No. 1 in the iTunes Top 10 World Albums chart, making it the first Indian album to reach the spot.
 Rahman was honoured in 2013 with a street named after him in Markham, Ontario, Canada, called "Allah-Rakha Rahman Street".

Milestones 
 At the Academy Awards, Rahman is the first Asian to win two Oscars in the same year and be nominated twice in the same year and also the first Asian to receive multiple nominations for the Academy Award for Best Original Score.

See also 
 List of accolades received by Slumdog Millionaire

Footnotes

References

External links 
A. R. Rahman Official Website

Awards
A. R. Rahman